MTV Indonesia was an Indonesian free-to-air television network, part of MTV. The network was launched on 5 May 1995, It was the fifth MTV version launched in the world, and first to broadcast via free-to-air television. MTV Indonesia later became part of programming block on ANteve alongside with MTV Asia program, before moving to the newly inaugurated network Global TV on 7 March 2002, MTV Indonesia also aired on Singapore and Malaysia via Suria, it was closed for the second time on 1 November 2015.

History 

MTV Indonesia aired MTV shows such as TRL, Fanatic, Diary; Europe, Asia such as Most Wanted, Fresh, Alternative Nation, Asia Hitlist, Land, Rock, Absolute, Fresh, Connect, Wow, Non Stop Hits, 100% Indonesia, Ampuh and Screen.

MTV Asia launched MTV Indonesia on 5 May 1995 and ANteve began to aired MTV program since launch of MTV Indonesia, due to financial crisis, ANteve terminated MTV program on 7 March 2002, on the same day, Global TV started alliance with MTV Asia to aired MTV Indonesia.

On 1 April 2002, MTV Indonesia started on Global TV while still trial broadcast.

On 1 May 2002, MTV Indonesia launched on Global TV and later, on 8 October 2002, Global TV officially launched as music television channel and MTV now aired for 24 hours.

MTV on Global TV became the world first free-to-air television channel to aired MTV for 24 hours.

Like many MTV channel in other countries, MTV Indonesia program with English language from United States and Asia are subtitled.

MTV Indonesia also aired on Singapore and Malaysia with Suria from 2003 until 2006.

On 15 January 2005, Global TV reduced MTV program to 12 hours and started produce own program after agreement with MTV on 15 October 2004 with MNC Media owner Hary Tanoesoedibjo.

On 1 January 2007, Global TV announced plans to produce programs on MTV Indonesia with MTV Networks in-house with MNC Media. Live programs included the grand finale of MTV VJ Hunt, MTV Indonesia Movie Awards, MTV Indonesia Music Awards, MTV Staying Alive and MTV EXIT.

On 1 January 2012, Global TV stopped airing MTV Indonesia, but still aired MTV EXIT on 1 September 2012 without the MTV logo.

On 1 November 2014, MTV Indonesia relaunched with the tagline "1000% anak muda" or "1000% youth" and aired on local television CTV networks in Jakarta, Bandung, Surabaya, Makassar, Banjarmasin.

On 1 November 2015, MTV Indonesia closed for the second time after Grup Karsa not renewed contract with Viacom.

Radio and magazine 
 MTV Trax was a radio station using frequency 101.4 FM, established on 1 January 2000 in Jakarta, Semarang and Yogyakarta.
 MTV Magazine was an entertainment magazine that discussed music, movies and lifestyle. It was established on 1 January 2000 in Jakarta. Later when the franchise was dissolved, it became Trax (Magazine).

Video Jockeys 
Video jockeys included:

Programming

Final program

Previous program

Slogans 
 Tetap Jreng di Tahun Noceng, Nonton Terus MTV (1999-2002)
 Nongkrong Terus di MTV (2002-2005)
 MTV Gue Banget (2002-2012)
 1000% Anak Muda (2014-2015)

See also 
 Nickelodeon Indonesia
 VH1 Indonesia
 MTV Networks Asia

References

External links 
  

MTV channels
Television stations in Indonesia
Television channels and stations established in 1995
Music organizations based in Indonesia